Mount Franklin is a brand of bottled spring water available in Australia. It is owned and manufactured by Coca-Cola Amatil.

Products
Mount Franklin spring water is available in various sizes from 250 ml to 1.5 litre. A variety of flavoured waters are also available, as are carbonated varieties.

Partnerships
Australian model Jennifer Hawkins has been the brand ambassador for Mount Franklin Lightly Sparkling Water since 2014. The brand is also associated with the National Breast Cancer Foundation, including through fundraising activities during Breast Cancer Awareness Months. From 2010, Mount Franklin also began a partnership with the McGrath Foundation to raise funds for breast care nurses across Australia.

From 2012 to 2018, the brand was the official water provider for the Australian Open tennis tournament. In 2018 the contract was transferred to Ganten, a bottled water company based in China.

Awards
Mount Franklin was voted best bottled water in the 2013 Trip Advisor Australia's Travellers' Choice Favourites awards.

See also

 Cool Ridge
 Pump

References

External links
 
 

Bottled water brands
Australian drinks
Food and drink companies established in 1981
1981 establishments in Australia